Tritoxa flexa is a species of picture-winged fly in the genus Tritoxa of the family Ulidiidae.

Distribution
Canada, United States.

References

Ulidiidae
Diptera of North America
Taxa named by Christian Rudolph Wilhelm Wiedemann
Insects described in 1830